Zhoushan Putuoshan Airport  is an airport situated on Zhujiajian Island in Zhoushan, Zhejiang, China. Construction originally started following an agreement signed January 19, 1994, in Zhoushan, between Zhoushan Civil Aviation Airport Construction and Zhejiang Province and Pacific Development Company.

Airlines and destinations

The following airlines serve the airport with scheduled flights:

See also
List of airports in the People's Republic of China

References
Zhoushan Airport https://web.archive.org/web/20090412035839/http://www.zsairport.com.cn/

Airports in Zhejiang
Airports established in 1997
1997 establishments in China
Zhoushan